Kevin Dwayne Henderson (born March 22, 1964) is a professional basketball player. He played college basketball for the Cal State Fullerton Titans and played for the Golden State Warriors and Cleveland Cavaliers in a two-season NBA career. In 22 games, he averaged 10.7 minutes and 3.0 points per game.

References

1964 births
Living people
American men's basketball players
Basketball players from Baltimore
Cal State Fullerton Titans men's basketball players
Cleveland Cavaliers draft picks
Cleveland Cavaliers players
Golden State Warriors players
Point guards
Saddleback Gauchos men's basketball players
Shooting guards